The 16th Regiment Illinois Volunteer Cavalry was a cavalry regiment that served in the Union Army during the American Civil War.

Service
The  16th Illinois Cavalry was organized at Camp Butler, Illinois, between January and April 1863 from numerous independent companies of Illinois cavalry.

The regiment mustered out on August 19, 1865 .

Total strength and casualties
The regiment suffered 3 officers and 30 enlisted men who were killed in action or who died of their wounds  and 1 officer and 228 enlisted men who died of disease, for a total of 262 fatalities.

Commanders
 Colonel Christian Thielemann - discharged August 9, 1864.
 Colonel Robert Wilson Smith

Notable members
 George P. McLain (1847–1930), Los Angeles, California, City Council member at the turn of the 19th-20th centuries
 Sgt Paul Vandervoort, Company M - 11th Commander-in-Chief of the Grand Army of the Republic, 1882-1883

See also
List of Illinois Civil War Units
Illinois in the American Civil War

Notes

References
The Civil War Archive

Units and formations of the Union Army from Illinois
1862 establishments in Illinois
Military units and formations established in 1862
Military units and formations disestablished in 1865